Harding Academy may be:
 
 Harding Academy (Memphis)
 Harding Academy (Nashville)
 Harding Academy (Searcy, Arkansas)